Diploprionini is one of the five tribes in the subfamily Epinephelinae, the groupers, which is part of the family Serranidae which also includes the anthias and the sea basses.

Genera
The following genera are included within the Diploprionini:

 Aulacocephalus Temminck & Schlegel, 1843
 Belonoperca Fowler & B.A. Bean, 1930
 Diploprion Cuvier, 1828

References

Epinephelinae
Fish tribes